Wang Xu (born September 27, 1985, in Beijing) is a female Chinese freestyle wrestler who competed at the 2004 Summer Olympics in Athens, winning a gold medal in the 72 kg weight class.

She was replaced at the 2008 Beijing Olympics by Wang Jiao, who went on to win the gold medal.

References

External links
Profile at DatabaseOlympics.com

1985 births
Living people
Chinese female sport wrestlers
Olympic gold medalists for China
Olympic wrestlers of China
Sportspeople from Beijing
Wrestlers at the 2004 Summer Olympics
Olympic medalists in wrestling
Asian Games medalists in wrestling
Wrestlers at the 2006 Asian Games
Medalists at the 2004 Summer Olympics
Medalists at the 2006 Asian Games
Asian Games gold medalists for China
20th-century Chinese women
21st-century Chinese women